Shadërvan is a marble fountain located between the Çarshi Mosque and the Museum of Kosovo in Pristina, Kosovo, and is a typical component of Ottoman architecture. The fountain is the only one remaining in the city from over fifty that once existed. In addition to providing a source of drinkable water, Shadërvan has been traditionally used for ritual ablution.

References 

Buildings and structures in Kosovo
Fountains in Europe